The 1917 Dayton Triangles season was their fifth season in the Ohio League.  The team posted a 5–1–2 record.

Schedule

Game notes

References
Pro Football Archives: Dayton Triangles 1917

Dayton Triangles seasons
Dayton Triangles Season, 1917
Dayton Tri